The Federal Polytechnic Damaturu is a federal government higher education institution located in Damaturu, Yobe State, Nigeria. The current acting Rector is Usman M. Kallamu.

History 
The Federal Polytechnic Damaturu was established in 1992.

Courses 
The institution offers the following courses;

 Marketing
 Electrical/Electronic Engineering
 Statistics
 Urban and Regional Planning
 Office Technology and Management
 Science Laboratory Technology
 Electrical/Electronic Engineering Technology
 Surveying and Geo-Informatics
 Statistics
 Computer Science
 Public Administration
 Mechanical Engineering Technology
 Computer Engineering
 Estate Management and Valuation

References 

Federal polytechnics in Nigeria
1992 establishments in Nigeria
Yobe State